Kelanlu or Këlanlu may refer to:
Kelanlu, northern Ararat, Armenia
Kelanlu, southern Ararat, Armenia

See also
Verin Kelanlu, Armenia